The 1946 Northwest Conference football season was the season of college football played by the seven member schools of the Northwest Conference (NWC) as part of the 1946 college football season.

The Willamette Bearcats won the NWC championship with a 6–2–1 record (6–0 against conference opponents) and outscored all opponents by a total of 129 to 94. The College of Idaho Coyotes finished in second place, compiled a 6–4 record, and led the conference in scoring offense with an average of 15.7 points per game. The Puget Sound Loggers tied for third place with a 3–4–1 overall record, but led the conference in scoring defense, giving up an average of only 6.5 points per game.

Conference overview

Teams

Willamette

The 1946 Willamette Bearcats football team epresented the Willamette University of Salem, Oregon. In their first and only season under head coach Walt Erickson, the team compiled a 6–2–1 record (6–0 against NWC opponents) and outscored opponent by a total of 129 to 94.

Three Willamette players were unanimous selections to the 1946 All-Northwest Conference football team: Marv Goodman at end; Garrell Deiner at tackle, and Larry McKeel at back. End Bill Reder and back Bob Douglas received second-team honors.

College of Idaho

The 1946 College of Idaho Coyotes football team represented the College of Idaho of Caldwell, Idaho. In their sixth year under head coach Clem Parberry, the team compiled a 6–4 record (5–2 against NWC opponents), finished in second place in the Northwest Conference, and outscored opponents by a total of 157 to 125.

Linfield

The 1946 Linfield Wildcats football team represented the Linfield University of McMinnville, Oregon. Led by head coach Wayne Harn, the team compiled a 4–3–1 record (3–2–1 against NWC opponents), tied for third place in the Northwest Conference, and outscored opponents by a total of 102 to 72.

Puget Sound

The 1946 Puget Sound Loggers football team represented the University of Puget Sound of Tacoma, Washington. Led by head coach Frank W. Patrick, the team compiled a 3–4–1 record (3–2–1 against NWC opponents), tied for third place in the Northwest Conference, and outscored opponents by a total of 106 to 52.

Pacific

The 1946 Pacific Badgers football team represented the Pacific University of Forest Grove, Oregon. Led by head coach Oswald D. Gates, the team compiled a 4–3–1 record (3–3 against NWC opponents), finished in fifth place in the Northwest Conference, and were outscored by a total of 60 to 58.

Whitman

The 1946 Whitman Fighting Missionaries football team represented Whitman College of Walla Walla, Washington. In their 32nd season under head coach Vincent Borleske, the team compiled a 2–5 record (1–5 against NWC opponents), finished in sixth place in the Northwest Conference, and were outscored by a total of 79 to 34.

British Columbia

The 1946 British Columbia Thunderbirds football team represented the University of British Columbia of Vancouver, British Columbia. Led by head coach Greg Kabat, the Thunderbirds compiled a 0–7 record (0–6 against NWC opponents), finished in seventh place in the Northwest Conference, and were outscored by a total of 169 to 39.

Lewis & Clark

All-conference team
The 1946 All-Northwest conference football team was selected by coaches and faculty of the conference schools. Players named to the first team were:
 Ends – Arnold Torgenson (or Thorgerson), Pacific; Marvin Goodman, Willamette
 Tackles – Garrell (or Gerald) Deiner, Willamette; Steuben Thomas, College of Idaho
 Guards – Bill Dahlgren, Pacific; William Currier, Linfield
 Center – Maitland Anderson, Pacific
 Backs – Larry McKeel (or McKell), Willamette; Warren Wood, Puget Sound; Jon Seeley, Linfield; Tom Oxman, College of Idaho

References